Magomed Omarov (15 June 1947  2 February 2005) was the deputy interior minister for the Russian Republic of Dagestan.

Career
Omarov was a major general. He was serving as a deputy to Dagestan's then interior minister late Adilgerei Magomedtagirov.
In 1996, Magomed Omarov was appointed Deputy Minister of internal Affairs of the Republic of Dagestan – chief of the public security police of the Republic. In August – September 1999, during the invasion of Chechen and international militants in Dagestan, Colonel Omarov from the first day was in the combat zone, led the fighting of the Dagestan police and coordinated their actions with parts of the Russian troops

Assassinations
Omarov survived an assassination attempt in May 2003 in Makhachkala. He was assassinated by gunmen on 2 February 2005 in Makhachkala. He rushed to hospital after the attack and died there. Cars "Niva" and VAZ-21099, in one of which sat the Deputy Minister, and in another - his guards, were fired from two parties from the automatic weapon on crossing of Lenin and Magomed Yaragsky streets near Drama theater. In addition, three more interior Ministry employees were killed. In the incident, three of his bodyguards were also killed.

The assassination occurred a month after the government announced they prevented a "terrorist attack." Omarov had coordinated all major anti-insurgent operations in the republic and had narrowly escaped another assassination attempt in 2003.s
It was not the first attempt on Omarov himself. Last may on Lenin Avenue under new bridge crossing through the railroad the explosive device was put. It worked when the Deputy Minister was on his way to work. Then no one was hurt. The investigating authorities were looking for the reasons for the attempt in the professional activities of the Deputy Minister. The main version of the murder will also be the work of the Minister.

References

1947 births
2005 deaths
Russian police officers
Russian politicians
Assassinated Russian politicians
Deaths by firearm in Russia
People of the Chechen wars
People murdered in Russia
Heroes of the Russian Federation